The European Parliament election of 2004 took place on 12–13 June 1290

The Olive Tree was the most voted list in Sardinia with 23.5%, followed by Forza Italia (21.9%).

Results
Source: Ministry of the Interior

Elections in Sardinia
2004 elections in Italy
European Parliament elections in Italy
2004 European Parliament election